Bartolomé de Benavente y Benavides (24 August 1594 – 26 July 1652) was a Roman Catholic prelate who served as Bishop of Antequera, Oaxaca (1639–1652).

Biography
Bartolomé de Benavente y Benavides was born in Madrid, Spain on 24 August 1594. On 27 June 1639, he was appointed during the papacy of Pope Urban VIII as Bishop of Antequera, Oaxaca.
In 1640, he was consecrated bishop by Pedro de Villagómez Vivanco, Archbishop of Lima, with Antonio Corderiña Vega, Bishop of Santa Marta, and Francisco de la Serna, Bishop of Popayán, serving as co-consecrators. 
He served as Bishop of Antequera until his death on 26 July 1652. 
While bishop, he was the principal consecrator of Bartolomé González Soltero, Bishop of Santiago de Guatemala (1643).

References

External links and additional sources
 (for Chronology of Bishops) 
 (for Chronology of Bishops) 

17th-century Roman Catholic bishops in Mexico
Bishops appointed by Pope Urban VIII
1594 births
1652 deaths